Lingayat, also known as Veerashaiva , are a community in India who adhere to Lingayatism. This is a list of notable Lingayats:

Saints

 Basavanna
 Allama Prabhu
 Akka Mahadevi
 Channabasavanna
 Devar Dasimayya
 Madivala Machideva
 Siddharama – of Solapur, Maharashtra
 Yediyur Siddhalingeshwara
 Viswabandhu Marulasiddha
 Sri Revanna Siddeshwara Swamy
 Sri Danamma Devi – of Guddapura, Maharashtra
 Sarvajna 
 Vemana 
 Sharane Sri Danamma Devi

Historical rulers

 Kittur Chennamma(1778–1829) – queen of the princely state of Kitturu, Karnataka; fought against Doctrine of lapse
 Belawadi Mallamma
 Haleri Kings – of Madikeri
 Linga Rajendra II – Haleri king of Kodagu
 Chikka Virarajendra – last ruler of Madikeri
 Keladi Nayaka Kingdom 
 Keladi Chennamma
 Shivappa Nayaka

Philanthropists

 Shivakumara Swamiji – head of Siddaganga Matha; Padma Bhushan awardee
 Gubbi Thotadappa - founder of famous Thotadappa hostel.

Education, science and technology

 D. C. Pavate - Vice chancellor of Karnataka University, Dharawada, Padmabhushan awardee. 
 Dr. DG Hallikeri – freedom fighter and educationist
 A. S. Adke – former vice-chancellor of Karnataka University and former Principal of Karnataka Regional Engineering College, Surathkal
 M. Mahadevappa – agricultural scientist and plant breeder; Padma Bhushan awardee
 Dr. MC Modi – eye surgeon and Padma Bhushan awardee
 Sharan Patil – philanthropist and orthopaedic surgeon
 S. G. Balekundri – irrigation expert and architect of Alamatti Dam
 Y. G. Parameshwara – first Indian blind doctor
 A.N. Prabhu Deva – former vice-chancellor of Bangalore University
 S. J. Nagalotimath – medical writer
 A. S. Kiran Kumar – Chairman of Indian Space Research Organisation (ISRO), Secretary, Department of Space, Chairman of Space Commission and Padma Shri awardee

Literature

 Sarvajna – Kannada poet
 Chamarasa – author of Prabhulingaleele
 Harihara – known as Ragaleya Kavi
 Raghavanka – known as Shatpadi Brahma
 Palkuriki Somanatha – Telugu poet, author of Basava purana
Nijaguna Shivayogi – 15th-century Kannada poet
 Hardekar Manjappa – known as Gandhi of Karnataka
 Phakirappa Gurubasappa Halakatti – Kannada writer
 G. S. Shivarudrappa – Poet and critic, Rashtra Kavi
 Chennaveera Kanavi – poet and critic
 Panchakshari Hiremath – writer and poet, short story writer, essayist, critic, translator, orator, editor, who writes in Kannada, Urdu and Hindi
P. Lankesh – writer and journalist, writing in the Kannada language
 Jayadevi Taayi Ligade – writer; first lady president of akhila Bharatha Kannada saahitya sammelana
 M. M. Kalburgi – Kannada scholar, Researcher, Vice Chancellor or Hampi Kannada University
  H.S. Shivaprakash- Poet,Playwright 
 L. Basavaraju – Kannada eminent scholar and writer of several books on Sharana Sahitya
 Sangamesh Saundattimath – Dravidian linguist
 M. Chidananda Murthy – Kannada writer, researcher and historian
 Channappa Uttangi – interfaith pioneer and writer
 K. Marulasiddappa – Kannada writer
 Chandrashekhar Patil – Kannada poet and playwright
 Patil Puttappa – Kannada writer and former Member of Parliament, Rajya Sabha
 Manu Baligar – former bureaucrat, and current president of Kannada Sahitya Parishat
 T. V. Sadasiva Pandarathar - Tamil Historical writer

Art and music

 Pandit Ganayogi Panchakshara Gawai – Hindustani and classical musician
 Basavaraj Rajguru – classical vocalist, Padma Bhushan awardee
 Mallikarjun Mansur – Hindustani vocalist, Padma Vibhushan, Kalidas Samman awardee
Rajshekhar Mansur-Hindustani vocalist
 Kumar Gandharva – Hindustani vocalist, Padma Vibhushan, Kalidas Samman awardee
 Pandit Puttaraj Gawai – Hindustani and classical musician, Padma Bhushan, Kalidas Samman awardee
 Mukul Shivputra – Hindustani classical music vocalist and son of Kumar Gandharva
 Balappa Hukkeri – Kannada folk singer
 Rajashekhar Mansur – classical vocalist
 Gubbi Veeranna – theatre director, known as 'father of Kannada film industry'
B. Jayashree - theatre
 Ranjani Shettar – artist and sculpurist
 Vyjayanthi Kashi – artist and Kuchipudi dancer
 Prateeksha Kashi – kuchipudi dancer
 Dr. Jayadevi Jangamashetti – Hindustani Music Vocalist

Politics

Chief Ministers 

Shivraj Patil – Home Minister of India 2004–2008, Speaker of Lok Sabha 1991–1996, Minister of Defence 1980–1989, Governor of Punjab 2010–2015, Governor of Rajasthan 2010-2012
 K. P. Puttanna Chetty – First President of Bangalore Municipality
 M. S. Gurupadaswamy – Leader of House of Rajya Sabha 1989-1990, Leader of Opposition in the Rajya Sabha 1971-1972, Minister of Agriculture
 Laxman Savadi – former Deputy Chief Minister, Minister for Transport and Minister for Co-operation, Government of Karnataka
 J. C. Madhu Swamy - Minister for Law and Parliamentary Affairs, and Minor Irrigation, Government of Karnataka
 B. C. Patil - Minister for Agriculture, Government of Karnataka
 V. Somanna - Minister for Housing, Government of Karnataka
 C. C. Patil – current Minister for Public Works Department, former Minister for Mines and Geology, Government of Karnataka
 Shashikala Annasaheb Jolle – Minister for Women and Child development, Senior Citizen and differently abled Empowerment, Government of Karnataka and MLA, Nippani
 Eshwara Bhimanna Khandre – MLA and former Minister, Government of Karnataka
 K. S. Nagarathanamma - former Speaker and Leader of opposition of Karnataka Legislative Assembly, and minister for Health and family welfare.
 S. Mallikarjunaiah – former MP Tumkur and Deputy Speaker of the Lok Sabha (1991–1996) 
 M.P. Prakash – Congress Leader and Former Deputy Chief Minister of Karnataka
 M. B. Patil – former Minister for Water Resources, Government of Karnataka
 Suresh Angadi – Minister of State for Railways, Government of India
 Suresh Shetkar – former MP of Zahirabad (Lok Sabha constituency), Telangana
 Gudleppa Hallikeri – freedom fighter and former Chairman of Legislative Council,
 M. V. Rajasekharan – former Minister of State in the Ministry of Planning, Government of India
 H.Siddhaveerappa – former minister for Home, Industries and Health, Leader of opposition, Government of Karnataka
 Murugesh Nirani – former Minister for Heavy Industry, Government of Karnataka
 Shamanur Mallikarjun – former MLA, Karnataka and Former Minister for Horticulture, Youth Services and Sports, Government of Karnataka
 S. A. Ravindranath – former minister for Horticulture and Sugar, government of Karnataka
 Gowdar Mallikarjunappa Siddeswara – Union Minister of State for Heavy Industries and Public Enterprises
 Smt.Basavarajeswari – three time MP from Bellary and former Union Minister of India
 Siddappa Kambli – politician, freedom fighter and contributor for Unification of Karnataka
 Ratnappa Kumbhar – former MP, MLC and Minister of Home, Food and Civil Supplies in Maharashtra Government
 Babagouda Patil –  BJP Leader, former MP and Union Minister of Rural Areas & Employment 
 Basangouda Patil – former Union minister of state for Railways and Textiles 
 Dr Neeraj Patil – former Mayor of Lambeth, London
 Vatal Nagaraj –  former MLA and founder leader of Kannada Chalavali Vatal Paksha
 B. Y. Raghavendra – MP Shimoga; son of CM B. S. Yeddyurappa
 M. P. Renukacharya – MLA and former Minister for Excise, Government of Karnataka
 Vinay Kore – former Minister of Non-Conventional Energy & Horticulture, Govt. of Maharashtra and the Chairman of the Warana Group of Industries
 D. C. Srikantappa – former three time MP from Chikmagalur
 Basavaraj Patil Sedam – former Member of Lok Sabha and Rajya Sabha
 M. Rajasekara Murthy – former Union minister for Surface Transport,  MP, Lok Sabha and Rajya Sabha, and former minister for Finance, Revenue, Excise and Commerce and Industry, Karnataka 
 Dilip Gangadhar Sopal – former MLA, Barshi, Solapur, and former minister for Law and Judiciary, and Water supply and Sanitation, Government of Maharashtra
 Shashil G. Namoshi – former Member of Legislative Council, Karnataka
Basavaraj Patil Attur – former minister for Higher Education, Small Scale Industries, and Minor Irrigation
 Anant Gudhe – former Member of Parliament, Amravati
 Chandrakant Khaire – former Member of Parliament, Aurangabad
 Shamanuru Shivashankarappa – MLA, Davanagere South, former Minister for Horticulture and Agro Marketing, Government of Karnataka and President, Akhila Bharatha Veerashaiva Mahasabha
 H. K. Patil – former Minister for Rural Development and Panchayat Raj, Government of Karnataka
 Sharan Prakash Patil – former Minister for Medical Education, Government of Karnataka
 S. R. Patil – former Minister for Infrastructure, Information Technology, Biotechnology, Science and Technology, Planning and Statistics, Government of Karnataka
 H. S. Mahadeva Prasad – former Minister for Co-operation, Government of Karnataka
 Prakash Babanna Hukkeri – Member of Parliament, Chikkodi and former Minister for Sugar, Small Scale Industries and Endowments, Government of Karnataka
 Bhagwanth Khuba – Minister of State for Chemicals and Fertilizers,  New and Renewable Energy of India and Member of Parliament, Bidar
 P. C. Gaddigoudar – Member of Parliament, Bagalkot
 Karadi Sanganna Amarappa – Member of Parliament, Koppal (Lok Sabha constituency)
 B. Jayashree – artist and former Member of Rajya Sabha, Padma Shri awardee
Annasaheb Jolle - Member of Parliament, Chikkodi.
 B B Patil – Member of Parliament, Zahirabad (Lok Sabha constituency), Telangana
 Satish Hiremath – former Mayor of Oro Valley, Arizona, United States of America
 Manjunath Kunnur – former MP, Dharwad South
 Basavraj Madhavrao Patil – MLA, Ausa, Latur, and former Minister for Rural Development, Government of Maharashtra
 Siddharam Satlingappa Mhetre – MLA, Akkalkot, Solapur, and former Minister for Home and Rural Development, Government of Maharashtra
 Karne Prabhakar – MLC, Telangana, and Spokesperson of TRS
 Vijay Deshmukh  – former Minister of state for PWD, Transport, Labour and Textiles, Government of Maharashtra, and MLA, Solapur North
 Vinay Kulkarni – former Minister for Mines and Geology, Government of Karnataka, and MLA, Dharwad
 Ganesh Hukkeri – Member of Legislative Assembly, Chikkodi
 Lakshmi Hebbalkar – Member of Legislative Assembly and former President, Karnataka Pradesh Congress Committee women's wing
 B. Y. Vijayendra - Vice-president of Bharatiya Janata Party Karnataka state unit.
Siddharam Satlingappa Mhetre-mla Maharashtra
Rahul Siddhvinayak Bondre

Business

 Vinay Kore – Chairman of the Warana Group, Maharashtra
 Gowdar Mallikarjunappa Siddeswara – MP and head of GM group
 Ashok Kheny – head of Nandi Infrastructure Corridor Project (NICE)
 Baba Kalyani – Chairman of Bharat Forge and Kalyani Group, Padma Bhushan awardee
 Prabhakar B. Kore – Karnatak Lingayat Education Society (largest education society in the state), Chairman, MP and former minister
 Murugesh Nirani – of Nirani Group
 Shamanuru Shivashankarappa – of Bapuji Educational Association
 Vijay Sankeshwar – Chairman of VRL Group

Media and entertainment

 M. P. Shankar – veteran Kannada film actor and director
 Doddanna – veteran Kannada actor
 Manjula – actress
 B.C. Patil – Kannada actor
 Prabhu deva – Indian actor, known as the Indian Michael Jackson
 Mugur Sundar – Indian director
 Raju Sundaram – Tamil actor
 Nagendra Prasad – actor
 Gubbi Veeranna – theatre director
 B. C. Gowrishankar – choreographer
 K. M. Chaitanya – director
 Sharath Lohitashwa – actor
 Lohithaswa – actor and writer
 Kavitha Lankesh – writer and director
 Gauri Lankesh - journalist
 Vedhika Kumar – actress and model
 Chindodi Leela – actress and dramatist, Padmashri awardee
 Indrajit Lankesh – director
 Preetham Gubbi – director
 Dilip – South Indian actor
 Girija Shettar – actress
 Chetan Kumar – actor
 Shashank – Kannada director
 Uma Shivakumar – actress
 Vaijanath Biradar – comedy actor
 P. Neelakantan – Tamil director
 Sunil Nagappa – actor
 Sanchari Vijay – actor, winner of Best actor award in 62nd National Film Awards
 Anoop Seelin – music director
 Dhananjay – Kannada actor
 Naga Kiran – Kannada actor
 Kishore Kumar – South Indian actor
 Sumanth Shailendra – Kannada actor
 Pushkara Mallikarjunaiah - Kannada Producer
 S. N. Surendar- Playback Singer (Malayalam)
 C. Rudraiah – Tamil director
 Aditi Prabhudeva - Kannada actress
Chitkala Biradar - actress

Sports

 Prarthana Thombare – Indian tennis player
 Nanjangud Shivananju Manju – Indian footballer
 Laxmikant Kattimani – Indian footballer
 Gagan Ullalmath – Indian swimmer
 Manju Nadgoda – Indian cricketer
 Sujith Somasunder – Indian cricketer
 Satish Kumar – Indian taekwondo player
 Deepak Chougule – Indian cricketer
 Harishchandra Birajdar – wrestler and first Hind Kesari from Maharashtra, Commonwealth Games gold medallist, Dhyanchand Award recipient
 Yere Goud – Indian cricketer
 KL Rahul – Indian cricketer
 Kruthik Hanagavadi - Indian Cricketer
Kashiling Adake - Kabbadi player

Military and police

 General Satyawant Mallanna Shrinagesh – 3rd Chief of Army Staff - Indian Army, and former Governor of Assam, Andhra Pradesh and Mysore state
 Lieutenant General B. S. Raju, UYSM, AVSM, YSM – Vice Chief of the Army Staff of Indian Army, former Director General of Military Operations 
 Lieutenant General Ramesh Halagali, AVSM, SM – former Deputy Chief of Indian Army
 Col M. B. Ravindranath VrC - Inidan Army Officer and Vir Chakra Awardee
 Shankar Bidari, IPS – former Director general of police, Karnataka and Commissioner of Police of Bangalore city
 L. Revanasiddaiah, IPS – former Additional Director, Central Bureau of Investigation, DGP, Karnataka and Commissioner of Police of Bangalore city
 B. G. Jyothi Prakash Mirji, IPS – former Commissioner of Police of Bangalore city
 Veeranna Aivalli, IPS – former Chairman of Aviation Security Audit Programme, International Civil Aviation Organization, United Nations
 Mallikarjun Bande – slain Indian Police Sub-Inspector
 Lance Naik Hanumanthappa Koppad – Indian soldier
 V. C. Sajjanar, IPS - Telangana Police officer known as an Encounter Specialist

Law and judiciary

 V. S. Malimath – former Chief Justice of Kerala and Karnataka
 Pramila Nesargi – advocate, politician and activist
 Mohan Shantanagoudar – Former Judge of the Supreme court of India and former Chief Justice of Kerala High Court

Others

 M. D. Nanjundaswamy – farmer leader and activist
 Subhash Mendhapurkar – social activist, Himachal Pradesh

References

External links 
 Community dominance and political modernisation: the Lingayats, Shankaragouda Hanamantagouda Patil, 
 List of Prominent Lingayats
 Lingayat Religion
 Welcome to Lingayat Religion
 Basava Divine Center

Lingayats
Hindu communities